Sani Haruna Kaita (born 2 May 1986) is a Nigerian former professional footballer who played as a defensive midfielder.

Club career
Kaita was born in Kano, Nigeria. He joined Sparta Rotterdam in the 2005–06 season from Kano Pillars FC. Kaita moved to AS Monaco FC in September 2008.

Kaita left Monaco on 13 January 2009 and joined FC Kuban Krasnodar on loan through 31 December 2009. On 25 August 2009, he signed for Lokomotiv Moscow on loan from Monaco until December. On 25 February 2010 Alania Vladikavkaz signed the midfielder on loan. On 31 May 2010 FC Metalist Kharkiv signed Kaita on loan. On the last day of the 2011 winter transfer window, Kaita moved to Greek Superleague side Iraklis on a six-month loan deal.

In April 2014, Kaita was back in Nigeria training with Enyimba F.C. He made his debut against Sharks F.C. on 7 May and spent a three-month loan with the Aba side. The loan was part of the League Management Company's elite initiative for foreign based professionals. He signed for Ifeanyi Ubah in the Nigeria premier league for the season 2015, but played only few matches for the team.

In 2016, he joined a Finnish club, JS Hercules, which was coached by his former national team coach Daniel Amokachi.

For the 2017 season, Kaita signed for Veikkausliiga team RoPS. He made his debut for the team on 28 January 2017 in a Suomen Cup 3–0 win against HauPa. He scored his first goal on 22 April against Ilves Tampere in the 79th minute, after being brought in three minutes earlier for injured team captain Antti Okkonen. At the end of the year he was released after featuring sporadically in the second half of the season. After the season, his signing was publicly called a poor bargain by club president Risto Niva.

International career
Kaita caught the eye of Sparta when playing all seven matches for Nigeria U-20 at the 2005 FIFA U-20 World Cup in the Netherlands.

He was also a member of the senior Nigeria national team making his debut in a 3–0 friendly loss against Romania in November 2005. Kaita was sent off in a match against Greece on 17 June 2010, in their second 2010 FIFA World Cup match for kicking Vasilis Torosidis. This made him the first Nigerian player to be sent off in a World Cup match. Greece went on to score their first World Cup goals, and win their first match in the World Cup.

Honours
Nigeria
African Cup of Nations: bronze medalist 2006, 2010
Olympic Games: runner-up 2008

Nigeria U20
FIFA U-20 World Cup: runner-up 2005

External links
 
 Player profile – Sparta Rotterdam
 Career stats – Voetbal International

References

1986 births
Living people
Sportspeople from Kano
Association football midfielders
Nigerian footballers
Kano Pillars F.C. players
Sparta Rotterdam players
AS Monaco FC players
FC Kuban Krasnodar players
FC Lokomotiv Moscow players
FC Spartak Vladikavkaz players
SC Tavriya Simferopol players
FC Metalist Kharkiv players
Iraklis Thessaloniki F.C. players
Eredivisie players
Ligue 1 players
Super League Greece players
Cypriot First Division players
Veikkausliiga players
Nigeria international footballers
Nigeria under-20 international footballers
Footballers at the 2008 Summer Olympics
Olympic footballers of Nigeria
Olympic silver medalists for Nigeria
2006 Africa Cup of Nations players
2010 Africa Cup of Nations players
Nigerian expatriate footballers
Expatriate footballers in the Netherlands
Nigerian expatriate sportspeople in the Netherlands
Expatriate footballers in Monaco
Expatriate footballers in France
Nigerian expatriate sportspeople in France
Expatriate footballers in Russia
Expatriate footballers in Ukraine
Nigerian expatriate sportspeople in Ukraine
Expatriate footballers in Greece
Enyimba F.C. players
Russian Premier League players
2010 FIFA World Cup players
Olympic medalists in football
Medalists at the 2008 Summer Olympics
Nigerian expatriate sportspeople in Monaco
Expatriate footballers in Finland
Nigerian expatriate sportspeople in Finland
Ukrainian Premier League players
Moldovan Super Liga players
JS Hercules players